José Luis Villalongo Cepeda (born 27 April 1938) is a Puerto Rican sprinter. He competed in the men's 4 × 400 metres relay at the 1960 Summer Olympics.

References

1938 births
Living people
Athletes (track and field) at the 1959 Pan American Games
Athletes (track and field) at the 1960 Summer Olympics
People from Santurce, Puerto Rico
Puerto Rican male sprinters
Olympic track and field athletes of Puerto Rico
Pan American Games competitors for Puerto Rico